Ray Gun Suitcase is the tenth album by the American rock group Pere Ubu.

After a string of slickly produced, pop-oriented albums for major labels, Ray Gun Suitcase returns to the darker, more complex sonic landscape associated with their earlier work.

Director's Cut
In 2005, to celebrate Pere Ubu's thirtieth anniversary, a "Director's Cut" was released with new mastering, alternative mixes, and two bonus tracks. David Thomas explains: "The point of doing a Director's Cut is to benefit from that older and wiser thing.  I reviewed all alternate mixes from the session, sometimes discovering that an earlier mix turned out to be superior to the chosen mix. As well, 10 years later, we have access to improved mastering technology. Consequently, there is a greater clarity and cohesion to the Director's Cut. We are not going to make both versions available. The Director's Cut is the way it's supposed to be. Period."

"Folly of Youth"  – 4:52
"Electricity"  – 4:30
"Beach Boys"  – 3:57
"Turquoise Fins"  – 3:10
"Vacuum in My Head"  – 4:21
"Memphis"  – 4:04
"Three Things"  – 4:49
"Horse"  – 5:02
"Don't Worry"  – 3:09
"Ray Gun Suitcase"  – 3:47
"Surfer Girl" (Brian Wilson)  – 2:13
"Red Sky"  – 5:26
"Montana"  – 5:58
"My Friend Is a Stooge for the Media Priests"  – 3:07
"Down by the River II"  – 3:52
"Memphis" (demo)*  – 4:16
"Down by the River II" (demo)*  – 3:49

* - Director's Cut only

Personnel
Pere Ubu
David Thomas - vocals, melodeon, musette, auto-cans, ray gun
Jim Jones - guitar, keyboard bass, backing vocals, keyboards, spike, sleigh bells
Robert Wheeler - EML synthesizers, Ensoniq EPS, theremin
Michele Temple - bass guitar, slide bass, guitar, lute
Scott Benedict - drums
with:
Scott Krauss - drums on "Memphis", "Beach Boys", "Down By The River" & "Montana"
Garo Yellin - electric cello on "Memphis", "Beach Boys", "Down By The River" & "Montana"
Paul Hamann - bass guitar on "My Friend Is A Stooge"; swirl bells on "Vacuum In My Head"

References

Pere Ubu albums
1995 albums
Tim/Kerr Records albums